Back Cove  is an estuary basin on the northern side of the City of Portland, Maine's downtown district.  It is nearly circular and about one mile in diameter. Baxter Boulevard, a popular loop trail, runs around the circumference of the cove. Being tidal, Back Cove dries out to mud flats at low tide and is not commercially navigable. It is sometimes incorrectly referred to as Back Bay.  Its mouth is crossed by Interstate 295 on Tukey's Bridge.

References

Parks in Portland, Maine
Geography of Portland, Maine
National Register of Historic Places in Portland, Maine
Transportation in Portland, Maine